Li Shuhuan (born 25 October 1996) is a Chinese modern pentathlete. He competed in the men's event at the 2020 Summer Olympics. He also competed in the men's individual event at the 2018 Asian Games held in Jakarta, Indonesia.

References

External links
 

1996 births
Living people
Chinese male modern pentathletes
Modern pentathletes at the 2020 Summer Olympics
Olympic modern pentathletes of China
Place of birth missing (living people)
Modern pentathletes at the 2018 Asian Games
20th-century Chinese people
21st-century Chinese people